The Capture of Aalst of 1584, also known as the Betrayal of Aalst, took place in early February, 1584, at Aalst, County of Aalst, Flanders (present-day Belgium), during the Eighty Years' War and the Anglo-Spanish War (1585–1604). In 1584, after the successful Spanish military campaign of 1583, the Governor-General Don Alexander Farnese, Prince of Parma, was focused in subjecting by hunger the cities located on the Scheldt and its tributaries. One of these cities was Aalst, located on the Dender river. In January, the garrison of Aalst, composed of English troops under the command of Governor Olivier van den Tympel, was surrounded and blocked by the Spanish forces led by Parma. In this situation, the English soldiers, tired of the lack of supplies and pay, finally surrendered the city to Parma, in exchange for 128,250 florins and entered the service of the Spanish army.

The advance of the Prince of Parma was unstoppable, and on April 7, after three months of siege, the city of Ypres surrendered. The next goal of the Spaniards was Bruges, and on May 24, the city capitulated without a single shot fired.

See also
 Army of Flanders
 Sir William Stanley
 Rowland York
 List of Governors of the Spanish Netherlands

Notes

References
 Geoffrey Parker. España y la rebelión de Flandes. Editorial Nerea, S.A., Madrid, 1989.  
 Geoffrey Parker. The Army of Flanders and the Spanish Road, 1567-1659. Second edition 2004. Cambridge University Press. 
 Willem J. F. Nuyens. Geschiedenis der nederlandsche beroerten in de XVIe eeuw: Geschiedenis van den opstand in de Nederlanden, van de komst van Alva tot aan de bevrediging van Gend: (1567-1576). Landenhuysen, 1867.

External links
 España y la rebelión de Flandes by Geoffrey Parker 

Aalst
Aalst
Aalst
Aalst
Aalst 1584
1584 in the Habsburg Netherlands
Conflicts in 1584
Capture
Aalst, Belgium